The Valmet Tuuli was a trainer aircraft, developed for the Finnish Air Force by the State Aircraft Factory (Valtion lentokonetehdas, VL). The aircraft was to be produced in 3 different versions. The last version, Tuuli III was redesigned from scratch, and is basically an entirely different aircraft.

History 
The design work on the aircraft was initiated in February 1941 under the leadership of the chief engineer Martti Vainio. The aircraft was a low-winged, tandem-seated trainer aircraft. The Finnish Air Force ordered a prototype, Tuuli I, in August 1942. The design work and its construction was ended in the spring of 1944, when the aircraft manufacturer was forced to put all its efforts in repairing the front-line aircraft. The Aircraft Factory built only stress testing models of the Tuuli I's wings and fuselage.

VL became part of the company in 1945 Valtion metallitehtaat (Valmet) and therefore, the Tuuli II's prototype became Valmet's first aircraft. Valmet wanted to transform weapons factories, which were currently focused on war-reparations to the Soviet Union, into a productive and profitable industry. Artillery factories were transformed into paper machine factories, etc. The leaders of the aircraft factory became professors of the Helsinki Technical University and directors of VTT. At this stage, the design of aircraft in Finland was cooled down and the quality suffered.

In September 1945 the design of the tuuli II  protype began  and was led by Torolf Eklund. The prototype was ready in the autumn of 1948. After this, the development stopped for a couple of years. The Finnish Air Force funded the prototype, and promised an order if it filled their requirements. The requirements had changed, and now the aircraft had to have side-by-side seating. The maiden flight with the Tuuli II was on 26 September 1951. Due to its low wing loading, its turning maneuvers was bad – this was from the military's view a serious deficiency. The aircraft was destroyed on 26 October 1951. The accident happened after the control stick had broken off, due to a forgotten stage of rivetting.

In 1957–1959, a third prototype, the Tuuli III was designed, after the FAF had announced the requirement of a new trainer aircraft. However, the Tuuli III lost the competition to the Swedish Saab 91 Safir, which was much cheaper and was already in production. The Tuuli III was to be the last military aircraft designed in Finland until the Valmet L-70 Vinka in the 1970s.

Variants
Valmet Tuuli I – Prototype trainer aircraft, only stress testing models built.
Valmet Tuuli II – Prototype trainer aircraft (1951), one built.
Valmet Tuuli III – Prototype trainer aircraft (1957–1959), one built.
Valmet Tuuli IV – Production trainer aircraft

Specifications (Tuuli III)

Operators

Finnish Air Force

See also

References

Further reading

External links

Valmet Tuuli III (in Finnish)

Tuuli
1950s Finnish military trainer aircraft
Single-engined tractor aircraft
Low-wing aircraft
Aircraft first flown in 1951
Conventional landing gear